A scythe is an agricultural hand tool for mowing grass or reaping crops.

Scythe or scythes may also refer to:

People
 Scythes, an ancient Sicilian tyrant

Arts, entertainment, and media

Fictional characters
 Scythe (Transformers), a Transformers character
 S.C.Y.T.H.E., a DC Comics supervillain team

Literature
 Scythe (novel), a young adult science fiction novel by Neal Shusterman
 "The Scythe" (short story), a 1943 short story by Ray Bradbury

Other uses in arts, entertainment, and media
 Scythe (board game), a boardgame by Jamey Stegmaier from Stonemaier Games
 Scythe: Digital Edition, a video game based on the board game
 The Scythe (album), an Elvenking album

Other uses
 Allen Scythe, a petrol-powered finger-bar mower
 Scythe Physics Editor, a free software physics modeling program

See also
Scythia (disambiguation)
Scythian (disambiguation)
Scythians (The Scyth), an ancient nomadic horse-riding people